The CEV Champions League is the highest level of European club volleyball in the 2014–15 season and the 56th edition. It ran from November 2014 until April 2015.

Eczacıbaşı VitrA won the title for the first time by defeating Yamamay Busto Arsizio 3–0 in the final.

Teams
The number of participants on the basis of ranking list for European Cup Competitions:

1.Clubs from Austria and Belgium do not meet the listing requirements and/or refusing.

League round
20 teams were drawn to 5 pools of 4 teams each.
The 1st and 2nd and the two bests 3rd ranked qualified for the Playoff 12
The organizer of the Final Four were determined after the end of the League Round and qualified directly for the Final Four.
The team of the organizer of the Final Four was replaced by the third best 3rd ranked team with the best score.

The remaining third-placed teams as well 2 four-placed teams with the best score will move to the Challenge Round of the CEV Cup.

The remaining teams will be eliminated.

In the League Round, the placing of the teams is determined by the number of matches won.

In case of a tie in the number of matches won by two or more teams, they will be ranked on the basis of the following criteria:
match points;
set quotient (the number of total sets won divided by the number of total sets lost);
points quotient (the number of total points scored divided by the number of total points lost);
results of head-to-head matches between the teams in question.

Pool A

 

|}

|}

Pool B

|}

|}

Pool C

 

|}

|}

Pool D

|}

|}

Pool E

|}

|}

Playoffs
The playoffs will consist of two rounds: Playoff 12 and Playoff 6. Each round is played in two legs. These will be played between 10 February and 12 March 2015.

If the teams are tied after two legs, a "Golden Set" is played. The winner is the team that first obtains 15 points, provided that the points difference between the two teams is at least 2 points (thus, the Golden Set is similar to a tiebreak set in a normal match).

At each leg, points are awarded to the teams in the same manner as in the Group Round (3 for 3:0 or 3:1, 2 for 3:2 etc.). So, if team A defeat team B in the first leg 3:0 and lose in the second leg 1:3, team A does not advance to the next round (as it would have been expected on the basis of analogy with football competitions), but the two teams are tied with 3 points each, and a Golden Set is played.

The three teams that win in Playoff 6 round advance to the Final Four along with the organizer of the Final Four. Germany's Dresdner SC will replace in the Playoffs 12 the organizer of the Final Four tournament as the lucky loser.

Playoff 12

|}

First leg

|}

Second leg

|}

Playoff 6

|}

1Eczacıbaşı VitrA Istanbul won the golden set 15–12

First leg

|}

Second leg

|}

Final four
Organizer:  Chemik Police
Venue:  Azoty Arena, Szczecin, Poland
All times are Central European Summer Time (UTC+02:00).
In case that two teams from the same country qualify to the semifinals, they will have to play each other.

Semifinals

|}

3rd place match

|}

Final

|}

Final standing

Awards

Most Valuable Player
  Jordan Larson (Eczacıbaşı VitrA)
Best Setter
  Maja Ognjenović (Chemik Police)
Best Outside Spikers
  Bethania de la Cruz (Eczacıbaşı VitrA)
  Helena Havelková (Yamamay Busto Arsizio)

Best Middle Blockers
  Milena Rašić (VakıfBank Istanbul)
  Maja Poljak (Eczacıbaşı VitrA)
Best Opposite Spiker
  Valentina Diouf (Yamamay Busto Arsizio)
Best Libero
  Gülden Kuzubaşıoğlu (Eczacıbaşı VitrA)
Fair Play Award
  Christiane Fürst (Eczacıbaşı VitrA)

References

External links 
Champions League

CEV Women's Champions League
CEV Women's Champions League
CEV Women's Champions League